Cockburn is an electoral district of the Legislative Assembly in the Australian state of Western Australia.

The district is based in Perth's south-western suburbs. Politically, it is a safe Labor seat.

Geography
Cockburn is located in the south-western suburbs of Perth. It is a coastal electorate, lying to the west of the Kwinana Freeway. The district includes the suburbs of Cockburn Central, Atwell, Yangebup, Munster, Beeliar, Success, Henderson, Wattleup, Hammond Park, most of Coogee and Lake Coogee, as well as parts of South Lake.

History
Cockburn was first contested at the 1962 state election. The seat's first member was Henry Curran, who had previously been the member for South Fremantle.

Cockburn has been at all times held by the Labor Party.

Members for Cockburn

Election results

References

External links
 ABC election profiles: 2005 2008
 WAEC district maps: current boundaries, previous distributions

Cockburn
1962 establishments in Australia
Constituencies established in 1962